Pearlridge Center is the second largest shopping center in Hawaii, after Ala Moana, and is Hawaii's largest enclosed shopping center, located in Aiea. Opened in 1972 and expanded in 1976, the enclosed mall is split into three "phases" (Uptown, Downtown, and Phase Three) and overlooks historic Pearl Harbor and the USS Arizona Memorial. The property includes the only monorail in Hawaii, the only emergency clinic located on mall property (Pali Momi Medical Center), and an eight-story office complex (Pearlridge Office Center).  The mall is owned by Washington Prime Group. It is on land owned by Kamehameha Schools.

Complex
Pearlridge consists of two major shopping areas: Pearlridge Uptown and Pearlridge Downtown. There are also two minor strip malls, Pearlridge East and Pearlridge West. The two major shopping areas are connected by the only monorail system in Hawaii. Pearlridge primary anchor tenants include: Macy's (formerly Liberty House) and, until 2021, Sears. There are over 170 stores and restaurants with two food courts, and a movie theater complex with sixteen screens.

Stand-alone stores
Not attached to any of the main Pearlridge buildings on either side (Ewa or Diamond Head sides) of  Pali Momi Medical Center are several stand-alone stores: Anna Miller's, and Inspiration Pop Up. Ross Dress for Less moved into the space vacated by Borders. The building formerly occupied by Inspiration Furniture is now occupied by Pali Momi Medical Center. Two thirds of GAP, also closed, is now owned by Victoria's Secret, while the other one third is currently unoccupied.

Stand-alone restaurants
Pearlridge also hosts several stand-alone restaurants in the mall property. Pearlridge West hosts Anna Miller's and Bravo Restaurant. Near Uptown is Monterey Bay Canners, while Downtown hosts Chili's, California Pizza Kitchen, and Big City Diner. The space once occupied by Sizzler is currently unoccupied.

Pearlridge Office Center
The Pearlridge Office Center is an eight-story office complex mainly housing financial and professional suites located towards Pearlridge East.

Sumida Farm
A unique landmark of Pearlridge is Sumida Farm, Hawaii's largest watercress farm, leased on land owned by Kamehameha Schools.

Transportation

Skycab

One of Pearlridge's most distinctive landmarks is the Skycab, Hawaii's only monorail system. Connecting both Uptown and Downtown, it provides a unique transport and a notable focal point of the center. Rides cost $1.00 one way. The monorail first ran on November 7, 1977, and was built by Rohr Industries.

References

External links
 
 Pearlridge Mall Map

Aiea, Hawaii
Washington Prime Group
Shopping malls in Hawaii
Buildings and structures in Honolulu County, Hawaii
Shopping malls established in 1972
Tourist attractions in Honolulu County, Hawaii
1972 establishments in Hawaii
Commercial properties of Kamehameha Schools